Remote Control is a 1930 American pre-Code comedy film directed by Nick Grinde, Edward Sedgwick, and Malcolm St. Clair and written by, among others, Frank Butler, F. Hugh Herbert, and Jack Nelson.

The film stars William Haines, Charles King, John Miljan, Polly Moran, and J. C. Nugent. It was released on November 15, 1930, by Metro-Goldwyn-Mayer.

Plot summary
William J. Brennan, a music shop owner, dreams of becoming a radio announcer.

Cast
 William Haines as William J. Brennan
 Charles King as Sam Ferguson
 Mary Doran as Marion Ferguson
 John Miljan as Doctor Kruger
 Polly Moran as Polly
 J. C. Nugent as Smedley
 Edward Nugent as Radio Engineer 
 Wilbur Mack as Chief of Police
 James Donlan as Blodgett
 Edward Brophy as Al
 Warner Richmond as Max
 Russell Hopton as Frank

References

External links
 
 
 
 

1930 films
1930s English-language films
American comedy films
1930 comedy films
Metro-Goldwyn-Mayer films
Films directed by Nick Grinde
Films directed by Edward Sedgwick
Films directed by Malcolm St. Clair
American black-and-white films
Films about radio people
1930s American films